Mauléon is a commune in the Deux-Sèvres department, western France. It is around 20 km south-east of Cholet, and around 70 km south-east of Nantes.

History
Mauléon was formed in 1965 by the merger of the two former communes of Châtillon-sur-Sèvre and Saint-Jouin-sous-Châtillon. The territory of the commune also includes the villages of La Chapelle-Largeau, Loublande, Moulins, Rorthais, Saint-Amand-sur-Sèvre, Saint-Aubin-de-Baubigné and Le Temple

Population

See also
Communes of the Deux-Sèvres department

References

Communes of Deux-Sèvres
Poitou